Grant "Twiggy" Baker (1973, Durban, South Africa) is a South African professional surfer. He is a 3-time world surfing champion, ocean conservationist and entrepreneur

Career highlights - 2014 / 2017 / 2020 World Big Wave Surfing Champion
 Winner, 2019 World Surf League (WSL) Big Wave Tour (BWT) Nazare Challenge 
 Winner, 2016 WSL BWT Puerto Escondido Challenge 
 Winner, 2014 WSL Mavericks Invitational
 Winner, 2013 WSL Punta Galea Challenge
 Winner, 2006 Mavericks Invitational

Awards
2020 – XXL Ride of the Year (Global Big Wave Awards) - 11 December 2019 for his big wave ride at Jaws, Hawaii
2019 WSL Big Wave World Tour Champion 2019 
2018 – Nazare Invitational Champion (Portugal)
2017 – WSL Big Wave World Tour Champion
2016 - WSL Big Wave World Tour Puerto Escondido Challenge Winner (Mexico)
2014 – XXL (Global Big Wave Awards) Surfline Best Overall Performance / Biggest Wave 
2014 – WSL Big Wave World Tour Champion
2013 – Mavericks Invitational Champion
2010 – XXL Ride of the Year Winner Global Big Wave Awards) - 13 February 2010 for his big wave ride at Mavericks, California
2008 – XXL Biggest Wave Winner Global Big Wave Awards) - 27 July 2007 for his big wave ride at Dungeons, South Africa
2006 – Mavericks Invitational Champion

References

1973 births
Living people
Sportspeople from Durban
South African surfers
World Surf League surfers
Big wave surfers